Michael Bannon is a golf coach from Northern Ireland.  He is the current coach of the 2011 U.S. Open champion, Rory McIlroy, and worked with him from a young age.   Bannon was the golf professional at Bangor Golf Club, and previously at Holywood Golf Club, where he worked with McIlroy.  As a golfer, Bannon competed in the 1997 Irish PGA Championship. 
Michael Bannon left his job at Bangor Golf Club to work full-time for world number one Rory McIlroy in October 2012.

References

Male golfers from Northern Ireland
Living people
Year of birth missing (living people)